is a city located in western Aomori Prefecture, Japan.

Hirosaki developed as a castle town for the 100,000 koku Hirosaki Domain ruled by the Tsugaru clan. The city is currently a regional commercial center, and the largest producer of apples in Japan.  The city government has been promoting the slogans "Apple Colored Town Hirosaki" and "Castle and Cherry Blossom and Apple Town" to promote the city image. The town is also noted for many western-style buildings dating from the Meiji period.

Geography
Hirosaki is located in western Aomori Prefecture, at the southern end of the Tsugaru plains of the Tsugaru Peninsula, southeast of Mount Iwaki and bordering on Akita Prefecture. The eastern and southern flanks of Mount Iwaki and its peak are within the city's borders. The Iwaki River flows from the west to the northeast through the city.

Neighboring municipalities
Aomori Prefecture
Ajigasawa
Fujisaki
Hirakawa
Inakadate
Itayanagi
Nishimeya
Ōwani
Tsugaru
Tsuruta
Akita Prefecture
Ōdate

Climate
Hirosaki has a cold humid continental climate (Köppen Dfa) characterized by warm short summers and long cold winters with heavy snowfall. The average annual temperature in Hirosaki is 10.5 °C. The average annual rainfall is 1357 mm with September as the wettest month. The temperatures are highest on average in August, at around 23.7 °C, and lowest in January, at around -2.3 °C.

Demographics
Per Japanese census data, the population of Hirosaki peaked at around the year 2000 and has declined since then.

City emblem
Hirosaki uses a Buddhist manji as its official emblem. This came from the flag emblem of Tsugaru clan, the daimyō of Hirosaki Domain during the Edo period.

History
Many human-shaped clay figures have been unearthed around the region which date as far back as 12,000 years. More of these figures date from the Jomon and Yayoi period.

The area around Hirosaki formed part of the domains of the Northern Fujiwara in the Heian period; Minamoto no Yoritomo awarded it to the Nanbu clan in the early Kamakura period after the defeat of the Northern Fujiwara (1189). During the Sengoku period a local retainer of the Nambu, Ōura Tamenobu, declared his independence (1571) and seized local castles. He pledged fealty to Toyotomi Hideyoshi at the Battle of Odawara in 1590, and was confirmed in his holdings with revenues of 45,000 koku. He also changed his name to "Tsugaru". After siding with Tokugawa Ieyasu at the Battle of Sekigahara, he was re-confirmed in his holdings with a nominal kokudaka of 47,000 koku and he began construction of a castle in Takaoka (present-day Hirosaki). This marked the start of Hirosaki Domain under the Tokugawa shogunate. His successor, Tsugaru Nobuhira, completed the castle in 1611, but its massive 5-story tenshu was lost to lightning in 1627. The domain's kokudaka increased to 100,000 koku in 1628.

The Tsugaru clan sided with the Satchō Alliance in the Boshin War of the Meiji Restoration, and was rewarded by the new Meiji government with an additional 10,000 koku. However, with the abolition of the han system on August 29, 1871, Hirosaki Domain was abolished, and replaced by Hirosaki Prefecture. The prefecture was renamed Aomori Prefecture in October of the same year, and the prefectural capital was relocated to the more centrally located Aomori.

Chōyō Elementary School was established on October 1, 1873. Apple horticulture was introduced to Hirosaki from 1877 and the 59th National Bank, the predecessor of Aomori Bank opened in March 1878. Hirosaki was proclaimed a city on April 1, 1889 with the establishment of the modern municipalities system and was thus one of the first 30 cities in Japan. It was also the third largest city in the Tōhoku region after Sendai and Morioka at the time. The Ōu Main Line connected Hirosaki with Aomori on December 1, 1894.

Hirosaki became the home garrison town for the Imperial Japanese Army's IJA 8th Division from October, 1898. The division was prominently active in the Russo-Japanese War.

Hirosaki City Hospital was established in 1901, and Hirosaki City Library in 1906. The first telephone service in the city stated from 1909. The first Cherry Blossom Festival was held in 1918. In 1927, the Kōnan Railway connected Hirosaki with Onoe. Hirosaki University was established in 1949.

On March 1, 1955, Hirosaki expanded through annexation of neighboring villages of Shimizu, Wattoku, Toyoda, Horikoshi, Chitose, Fujishiro, Niina, Funazawa, Takasugi, Susono and Higashimeya. Nishimeya became an enclave. The city further expanded on September 1, 1957, through annexation of neighboring Ishikawa Village.

The first Chrysanthemum and Maple Festival took place in 1964, and the first Hirosaki Castle Snow Lantern Festival in 1977. In 1979, the city was connected to the Tōhoku Expressway by a spur road named "Apple Road".

On November 15, 2006, old Hirosaki city, the town of Iwaki, and the village of Sōma were merged into an expanded city of Hirosaki.

Government
Hirosaki has a mayor-council form of government with a directly elected mayor and a unicameral city legislature of 28 members. The city, together with the neighbouring village of Nishimeya, contributes six members to the Aomori Prefectural Assembly. In terms of national politics, the city is part of Aomori 3rd district of the lower house of the Diet of Japan.

Economy
Hirosaki is the regional commercial center for southwest Aomori Prefecture. The main agricultural crops include apples and rice, with Hirosaki accounting for 20% of the total production of apples in Japan.

Education

Colleges and universities
Hirosaki University
Hirosaki Gakuin University
Hirosaki University of Health and Welfare
Hirosaki University of Heath and Welfare Junior College
School of Allied Medical Sciences, Hirosaki University
Tohoku Women's College
Tohoku Women's Junior College

Primary and secondary education
Hirosaki has 29 public elementary schools and 15 public junior high schools operated by the city government. There is one national public elementary school and public junior high school, and one private combined elementary/junior high school and one private junior high school. The city also has five public high schools operated by the Aomori prefectural Board of Education and four private high schools. 

Public high schools
Hirosaki High School
Hirosaki Chūō High School
Hirosaki Minami High School
Hirosaki Vocational High School
Hirosaki Technical High School

Private high schools
Tōōgijuku High School
Hirosaki Gakuin Seiai Middle and High School
Shibata Girls' High School
Hirosaki Higashi High School

Other schools
Hirosaki has four special education schools for the handicapped, three of which are operated by Aomori Prefecture, and one by the national government.

Transportation

Railways
 East Japan Railway Company (JR East) - Ōu Main Line
  - -  
 Kōnan Railway Company - Kōnan Line
 Hirosaki -  -  - ,
 Kōnan Railway Company - Ōwani Line
 -  -  -  -  -  -  -  -  -  -

Highways

Sports

Sports teams
Blancdieu Hirosaki FC, football team

Culture
 Tsugaru-jamisen, a virtuosic style of Tsugaru-jamisen playing. 
 Hirosaki Neputa Festival, held during the first week of August and is one of the 100 Soundscapes of Japan by the Ministry of the Environment 
Cherry Blossom Festival held in the park surrounding Hirosaki Castle. About 2,600 Sakura (Japanese cherry) blossom during the Japanese Golden Week vacation period. 
Maple and Chrysanthemum Festival held in October. Celebration for the passing summer and upcoming winter season.

Local attractions

 Hirosaki Castle
 Hirosaki Tōshō-gū
 Nakamachi Samurai Houses
 Chosho-ji
 Seishō-in
Fujita Memorial Japanese Garden
Iwaki Kōgen Prefectural Natural Park
Ōmori Katsuyama Site, National Historic Site
Zuiraku-en, National Place of Scenic Beauty
Tsushima Family Gardens, National Place of Scenic Beauty
Narita Family Gardens, National Place of Scenic Beauty

Noted people from Hirosaki 
 Hisashi Tonomura, musician
 Iwakiyama Ryūta, sumo wrestler
 Yōjirō Ishizaka, writer
 Norio Kudo, professional go player
 Mitsuyo Maeda, judo wrestler
 Juji Nakada, evangelist
 Yoshitomo Nara, modern artist
 Takanohana Kenshi, sumo wrestler
 Shūji Terayama, modern artist
 Wakanohana Kanji I, sumo wrestler
 Takahiro Shimoyama, basketball player
 Wakanosato Shinobu, sumo wrestler
 Hirofumi Arai, Zainichi Korean actor (Real Name: Park Kyung-sik, Hangul: 박경식)
 Shunsuke Kikuchi, musician
 Masakatsu Funaki, actor, mixed martial artist and professional wrestler
 Ningen Isu 人間椅子(バンド), music band
 Tomoko Aran, pop singer and lyricist
 Grant Bogdanove, jujitsu wrestler

References

External links 

  

 
Cities in Aomori Prefecture
1889 establishments in Japan